The Lushington Baronetcy, of South Hill Park in the County of Berkshire, is a title in the Baronetage of Great Britain. It was created on 26 April 1791 for Stephen Lushington, Chairman of the Honourable East India Company and Member of Parliament for Hedon, Helston, St Michaels, Penrhyn and Plympton Erle.

Stephen Lushington, son of the first Baronet, was a Member of Parliament and Judge of the Admiralty Court. Charles Lushington, another son of the first Baronet, also sat as a Member of Parliament. Sir Stephen Lushington, second son of the second baronet, was an admiral in the Royal Navy.

Lushington baronets, of South Hill Park (1791)
Sir Stephen Lushington, 1st Baronet (1744–1807)
Sir Henry Lushington, 2nd Baronet (1775–1863)
Sir Henry Lushington, 3rd Baronet (1803–1897)
Sir Henry Lushington, 4th Baronet (1826–1898)
Sir Andrew Patrick Douglas Lushington, 5th Baronet (1861–1937)
Sir Herbert Castleman Lushington, 6th Baronet (1879–1968)
Sir Henry Edmund Castleman Lushington, 7th Baronet (1909–1988)
Sir John Richard Castleman Lushington, 8th Baronet (born 1938)

References

Kidd, Charles, Williamson, David (editors). Debrett's Peerage and Baronetage (1990 edition). New York: St Martin's Press, 1990.

Lushington
1791 establishments in Great Britain